The Spanish Figure Skating Championships are a figure skating national championship held annually to determine the national champions of Spain. Medals may be awarded in the disciplines of men's singles, ladies' singles, pair skating, and ice dancing on the senior, junior, and novice levels. Not all disciplines in all levels have been held every year due to a lack of competitors.

Senior medalists

Men

Women

Pairs

Ice dancing

Junior medalists

Men

Women

Pairs

Ice dancing

Novice medalists

Men

Women

Pairs

Ice dancing

References

External links
 Federación Española de Deportes de Hielo (Spanish Ice Sports Federation) 

 

 
Figure skating national championships
Figure skating in Spain